Parliamentary elections were held in Bulgaria on 17 February 1902. The result was a victory for the Progressive Liberal Party, which won 89 of the 189 seats. Voter turnout was 49.8%.

Results

References

Bulgaria
1902 in Bulgaria
Parliamentary elections in Bulgaria
February 1902 events
1902 elections in Bulgaria